In enzymology, a carbamate kinase is an enzyme that catalyzes the chemical reaction

ATP + NH3 + CO2  ADP + carbamoyl phosphate

The 3 substrates of this enzyme are ATP, NH3, and CO2, whereas its two products are ADP and carbamoyl phosphate.

This enzyme belongs to the family of transferases, specifically those transferring phosphorus-containing groups (phosphotransferases) with a carboxy group as acceptor.  The systematic name of this enzyme class is ATP:carbamate phosphotransferase. Other names in common use include CKase, carbamoyl phosphokinase, and carbamyl phosphokinase.  This enzyme participates in 4 metabolic pathways: purine metabolism, glutamate metabolism, arginine and proline metabolism, and nitrogen metabolism.

Structural studies

References

 
 
 
 
 

EC 2.7.2
Enzymes of known structure